Çukurova University is a public university in Adana, Turkey. The university has sixteen faculties, three colleges, seven vocational colleges, three institutes and twenty six research and application centers. The university campus is located away from Adana city center, by the Seyhan Dam Lake.

The university, with its 1903 teaching staff, offers courses to over 40,000 undergraduate, post graduate and doctorate students.

The library has internet access and houses national and international publications. Computer rooms are available for student use campus-wide. These computer rooms are also used for computer-assisted education and scientific research. The university also offers its students recreational facilities including an indoor sports center and swimming pool, a boathouse and sports grounds. Students can make the best of their leisure time in any of the 29 student clubs.

The students of the university have the opportunity to do practical training abroad through AIESEC and similar organizations.  Transportation to the Balcalı Campus is offered by private bus services.

History 
The Faculty of Agriculture, founded in 1969 by Ankara University, and the Faculty of Medicine, founded in 1972 by Atatürk University, were combined to form Çukurova University in 1973. The number of the faculties rose to five when the faculties of Basic Sciences, Administrative Sciences and Engineering were founded.
In 1982, the Faculty of Basic Sciences was reorganized as the Faculty of Sciences and Letters, and the Faculty of Administrative Sciences was combined with the Department of Economics and Administrative Sciences forming the Faculty of Administrative Sciences and Economics. The Faculty of Engineering and Architecture emerged from the combination of the Faculty of Engineering and the Engineering Department of the Adana Academy of Administrative and Commercial Sciences. Also, the Faculty of Education was established when the two-year Foreign Language Colleges of the Ministry of  Education in Adana, Mersin and Hatay were combined. By 1992, the university helped to lay the foundation of three new universities in Turkey.  Two colleges, complete with modern buildings, laboratories and educational equipment were turned over to Mersin University, and three colleges were turned over to Hatay Mustafa Kemal University, and the Research and Application Center in Kahramanmaraş was taken over by Sutcu Imam University.

The number of faculties rose to 10 when the faculties of Fisheries, Theology, Dentistry and Fine Arts were established.

Adana Vocational College of Health and Kozan Vocational College were opened to education. With the addition of three post-graduate institutions and the State Conservatory of Çukurova University, the number of academic bodies increased to 21. The Karatas College of Tourism and Hotel Management was set up in 1994, the Karaisali Vocational College was set up in 1995 and the Vocational College of Kadirli offering two educational programs: Computer Programming and Industrial Electronics was founded in 1997. The Department of Physical Education was reorganized as the College of Physical Education and Sports, and in 1996, the Vocational College of Health Services was reorganized as the College of Health Sciences.

The Balcalı campus 

The Çukurova University's Balcali campus which is on the eastern side of Seyhan Lake occupies an area of 20 km². The name "Balcali" originates from the name of the village that stood on the present campus before the university was built.

The campus houses administrative and educational buildings with labs available for research services in  various branches of a hospital complex, a central library, a central cafeteria, sports facilities, teacher residences, social facilities and dormitories which accommodate a total of 3500 students.

Public transport vehicles commute between the city center and the campus.

Faculties and departments

Education 
The language of instruction in almost all the programs of the university is Turkish. However, the language of instruction in the Electric-Electronics and Mechanical Engineering Departments of the Faculty of Engineering and Architecture is English.

Students receive compulsory English preparatory classes in all the programs of the Faculty of Economics and Administrative Sciences.

English preparatory classes are optional for the students registered in the Mathematics, Chemistry and Physics Departments of the Faculty of Science and Letters and for the students of Civil Engineering, Geology, Architecture, Industry and Textile Departments of the Faculty of Engineering and Architecture.

Foreign language preparatory classes are conducted in the English, French and German Language Teaching Departments of the Faculty of Education.

The university consists of 10 faculties (with 80 undergraduate programs), three graduate schools (with 64 post-graduate programs), three colleges (with four undergraduate programs), seven vocational colleges (with 23 vocational programs) and YADIM (Foreign Languages Research and Application Center where  both undergraduate and post-graduate students are taught English), and a state conservatory.

Evening classes

Evening classes are available in the Department of Teacher Training of the Faculty of Education; in the Departments of Economics and Business in the Faculty of Economics and Administrative Sciences; in the Departments of Biology, Physics, Chemistry, Mathematics and Turkish Language and Literature in the Faculty of Science and Letters; in the Departments of Civil- Mechanical- Geological- Industrial- and Mining Engineering in the Faculty of Engineering and Architecture; in the Faculty of Fisheries; and in all Departments of Ceyhan and Osmaniye Vocational Colleges.

Student societies
There are numerous student societies active in Çukurova University.

Çukurova University Equestrian Sports Club ÇUASK
Founded in 2000, ÇUASK offers university students and staff alike an opportunity to start lessons in horse riding. The club has four Thoroughbred stallions that are used for schooling. Once students gain experience, they are free to go on trail rides anywhere within the campus boundaries. Instructors in the club are students themselves, who volunteer in giving lessons, taking care of the horses/stables and in managing the club.

Academic staff

The university employs 1903 academic staff (24 from abroad) of which 330 are professors, 141 associate professors, 299 assistant professors, 152 instructors, 723 research assistants, 76 specialists, 157 lecturers.

Related EU universities

Austria
 Fachhochschule BFI
 Klagenfurt University
 Paris-London Universitaet Salzburg
 Vorarlberger Landeskonservatorium
Belgium
 Free University Brussels
 Ghent University
 Hasselt University
 Hogeschool Antwerpen
 Hogeschool Sint-Lukas Brussel
 Libre De Bruxelles University
 Provinciale Hogeschool Limburg
Cyprus
 Cyrups University
Czech Republic
 Czech University Of Agriculture
 Liberec Technical University
 Masaryk University
 Univerzita Jana Evangelisty Purkyně v Ústí nad Labem
 Západočeská University in Plzeň
Denmark
 Aarhus University
 Dortmunt University
 West Jutland University College
Estonia
 Tallinn University
Finland
 Flensburg University
 Helsinki University
 Oulu University
 Svenska Yrkeshögskolan/ Up musik
 Swedish Polytechnic
 Tampere Polytechnic
 Tampere University
France
 Franche-Comté
 François Rabelais
 Paris-Sorbonne University (Paris 4)
 Universite de Corse-Pascal Paoli
Germany
 Anhalt University of Applied Sciences
 Augsburg University
 Bonn University
 Dresden Technical University
 Duisburg Essen University
 European Academy Berlin
 Flensburg Universitat
 Free University Berlin
 Friedrich Alexander University
 Hannover University
 Heidelberg University
 Hohenheim University
 Humboldt University
 Johannes Gutenberg University
 Ludwigshafen University of Applied Sciences
 Münster University
 Oldenburg university
 Osnabrück University
 Ruhr University Bochum
 Siegen University
 Technical University Darmstadt
 Technische Universitat Bergakademie Freiberg
 Technische Universitat Berlin
 ULM University
 Weingarten Padagogische Hogeschule
Greece
 Aristotle University of Thessaloniki
 Crete University
 H.R.T.E.I Ionian University
 Mediterranean Agronomic Institute of Chania
 T.E.I Ionian Islands
 Technological Educational Institute of Epirus
 Technological Educational Institute of Epirus
Hungary
 Corvinus University of Budapest
 Debrecen University
 Kodalanyi Janos University College
 Pecs University
 Semmelweiss University
Italy
 Bologna University
 Degli Studi Di Napoli
 Padova University
 Palermo University
 Roma Tre Universita
 Sassari University
 Universita degli Studi di Modena e Reggio Emmilia
 Universita Degli Studi Di Trento
 Universita Di Catania
 Universita di L'Aquila
 University of Pisa
Latvia
 Daugavpils Universitate
Lithuania
 Klapedia University
 Tarprautine aukstoji vadybos mokykia
Norway
 Norwegian University of Science and Technology
 Tromso University
Poland
 Adam Mickiewicz University
 Agriculture University in Szczecın
 Akademia Pedagogiczna W Krakowie
 Akademia Rolnicza w Lubline
 Akademia Techniczno - Rolnicza
 Bialystok University of Technology
 Mikolaja Kopernika Toruniu
 Ryzsard Lazarski
 Szczecin Agriculture University
 Szkola Glowna Gospodarstwa Wiejskiego
 Warsaw Agricultural University
 Warsaw University
Portugal
 Algarve University
 Lisboa (Lizbon) University
 Minho University
 Porto University
 Universidade De Tras-os-montese e Alto Douro
Romania
 Ovidius Constanta University
 Universitatea de Medicine si Fermacie din Targu Mures
 University of Agronomic Sciences And Veterinary Medicine
Slovakia
 Univerzita sv. Cyrila a Metoda v Trnave
 Slovak Agricultural University in Nitra
Spain
 Catalonia Technical University
 Granada Kraliyet Konservatuarı
 Jaume I University
 Lleida University
 Politecnica de Cartagena Universidad
 Politécnica de Valencia Universidad
 Real Conservatorio Superior
 Universidade de Santiago de Compostela
 Universitat De Girona
Sweden
 Högskolan I Boras University
 Linköping University
 Lulea University of Technology
 Vaxjö University
The Netherlands
 Delft University
 Drenthe University of Professional Education
 Eindhoven University Of Technology
 Wageningen University
The United Kingdom
 Edinburgh University
 Huddersfield University
 Lancaster University
 Nottingham University

References

Notable alumni
Turgay Avcı, politician and Deputy Prime Minister and Minister of Foreign Affairs of the Turkish Republic of Northern Cyprus
Hüseyin Dündar, world and European champion of martial arts disciplines
Fuat Oktay, 1st Vice President of Turkey
Macit Özcan, politician and mayor of Mersin
Ali Pilli, minister of Health of the 41st government of Northern Cyprus

External links
 Turkish Agricultural Learning Objects Repository
 Alumni Association of Çukurova University
 Unofficial Site of Çukurova University

 
Education in Adana
Educational institutions established in 1973
2013 Mediterranean Games venues
1973 establishments in Turkey